The 2015–16 Surinamese Hoofdklasse was the 83rd season of the SVB Hoofdklasse, the highest football league competition of Suriname. The season began in November 2015, and finished in June 2016.

Changes from 2014–15 

Bomastar and SNL was relegated to SVB Eerste Klasse.
Nishan '42 and Robinhood was promoted from the SVB Eerste Klasse.

Teams

Stadia and Locations 
''Note: Table lists in alphabetical order.

League table and results

Related competitions 
 2015–16 SVB Eerste Klasse
 2015–16 Surinamese Cup
 2015–16 SVB President's Cup

References 

SVB Eerste Divisie seasons
1
Surinam